Jan Ira Goldsmith (born January 26, 1951) is a Republican politician from San Diego, California, United States who served as the San Diego City Attorney from 2008 to 2016.

Education
He received his undergraduate degree from American University in Washington, DC and his J.D. degree from the University of San Diego School of Law.

Career
Upon graduating from law school he worked in private practice specializing in business litigation. He was also a council member and mayor for the city of Poway, California.

California State Legislature
Goldsmith was elected to three terms in the California state legislature, representing California's 75th State Assembly district from 1992 until 1998. The district covers Poway and other northern suburbs of San Diego County.

According to Goldsmith, his greatest legislative accomplishment had to do with juvenile justice. He chaired the Assembly subcommittee that put together a package of legislation that eventually became initiatives that the public got to vote on. He also felt foster care was another of his accomplishments. He was named legislator of the year for the Children’s Lobby. He carried the legislation that eliminated the bias against trans-racial adoption.

Goldsmith was the author of two bills, in 1994 and 1997, that attempted to legalize ferrets as pets in California. However, the California Department of Fish and Game opposed any introduction of ferrets into the state, and the bills failed.

Superior Court judge
Upon being term limited from the Assembly in 1998, Goldsmith made an unsuccessful bid for California State Treasurer, losing the primary to former Assembly Speaker Curt Pringle, who lost that election and went on to serve as mayor of Anaheim. Following his loss, Goldsmith became a San Diego County Superior Court judge, serving for 9½ years before stepping down to run for San Diego City Attorney.

San Diego City Attorney

Goldsmith ran for San Diego City attorney in 2008. In the June primary he received the most votes (32.2%) among five candidates, but not a majority. In the November runoff he defeated incumbent City Attorney Mike Aguirre, 59.4% to 40.4%. In 2012 he was re-elected without opposition.

In 2010 Goldsmith's office threatened the owners of a local restaurant with fines and jail for charging a fixed service charge instead of tipping; the issue was whether they were violating state disclosure laws. The city attorney later dropped the issue and did not pursue the case.

In 2013, Goldsmith was criticized by Mayor Bob Filner for prosecuting Jeff Olson for chalking anti-bank slogans on city sidewalks outside Bank of America branches, calling it "a stupid case" and a waste of city money. The prosecution was ultimately unsuccessful. With the defendant refusing a plea bargain, facing up to 13 years in jail and US$13,000.00 in fines, Judge Howard Shore admonished Olson's attorney, Tom Tosdal, from mentioning the First Amendment and political speech references during the trial. Additionally, Judge Shore issued a gag order, preventing communications with the media concerning the trial.

Goldsmith and Filner were in conflict almost from the day Filner took office, over several issues including medical marijuana, tourism funding, cuts to the City Attorney budget, road paving bonds, and the presence of Goldsmith's aide at a confidential city meetings. Goldsmith was a key figure in the August 2013 mediated negotiations that led to Filner's agreeing to resign.

Goldsmith left the City Attorney's office in 2016 as a result of term limits.

Post-political career
In March 2017 Goldsmith returned to private practice, joining the San Diego law firm Procopio as an of-counsel attorney on its litigation team.

Electoral history

Poway City Council

California State Assembly
1992

1994

1996

California State Treasurer

San Diego City Attorney

References

External links
Join California Jan Goldsmith

1951 births
Living people
Republican Party members of the California State Assembly
University of San Diego School of Law alumni
Mayors of places in California
People from Poway, California
American University alumni
San Diego City Attorneys
21st-century American politicians
21st-century American lawyers